Elections to Omagh District Council were held on 30 May 1973 on the same day as the other Northern Irish local government elections. The election used four district electoral areas to elect a total of 20 councillors.

Election results

Districts summary

|- class="unsortable" align="centre"
!rowspan=2 align="left"|Ward
! % 
!Cllrs
! % 
!Cllrs
! %
!Cllrs
! %
!Cllrs
! % 
!Cllrs
!rowspan=2|TotalCllrs
|- class="unsortable" align="center"
!colspan=2 bgcolor="" | UUP
!colspan=2 bgcolor="" | SDLP
!colspan=2 bgcolor="" | Alliance
!colspan=2 bgcolor="" | Nationalist
!colspan=2 bgcolor="white"| Others
|-
|align="left"|Area A
|27.7
|1
|bgcolor="#99FF66"|31.7
|bgcolor="#99FF66"|3
|7.1
|0
|0.0
|0
|33.5
|2
|5
|-
|align="left"|Area B
|27.0
|1
|0.0
|0
|16.7
|1
|0.0
|0
|bgcolor="#CDFFAB"|56.3
|bgcolor="#CDFFAB"|2
|4
|-
|align="left"|Area C
|bgcolor="40BFF5"|33.7
|bgcolor="40BFF5"|3
|25.9
|2
|15.0
|1
|15.0
|1
|10.4
|0
|7
|-
|align="left"|Area D
|23.2
|1
|0.0
|0
|9.8
|1
|0.0
|0
|bgcolor="#CDFFAB"|67.0
|bgcolor="#CDFFAB"|2
|4
|-
|- class="unsortable" class="sortbottom" style="background:#C9C9C9"
|align="left"| Total
|28.7
|6
|17.4
|4
|12.2
|3
|5.0
|1
|36.7
|6
|20
|-
|}

Districts results

Area A

1973: 2 x SDLP, 1 x UUP, 1 x Independent Unionist, 1 x Independent Nationalist

Area B

1973: 1 x UUP, 1 x Alliance, 1 x Independent Nationalist, 1 x Independent Unionist

Area C

1973: 3 x UUP, 2 x SDLP, 1 x Nationalist, 1 x Alliance

Area D

1973: 1 x UUP, 1 x Alliance, 1 x Independent Nationalist, 1 x Independent Republican

References

Omagh District Council elections
Omagh